Trịnh Trần Phương Tuấn (born April 12, 1997), better known by his stage name Jắck (or Jắck 5 Million, Tuấn ), is a Vietnamese singer, songwriter, rapper, and actor. 

He rose to fame during his time in the hip-hop group G5R with "Hồng nhan". Throughout his career, he has received many accolades: three awards at the Green Wave Awards and four awards at the Zing Music Awards. In addition, he was named the Best New Asian Artist of Vietnam at the 2019 Mnet Asian Music Awards and Best Southeast Asian Act at the 2020 MTV Europe Music Awards, and received the 26th Golden Apricot Blossom Award (2020) for Best Light Music Male Singer. He is also the first Vietnamese artist to win an Asian Television Award for Best Music Video Act with "Hoa hải đường".

Life and career

Early life and the beginning of career 
Jack 5 Million was born on April 12, 1997, in Ngai Dang Commune, Mo Cay Nam District, Ben Tre Province. He graduated from the professional college in vocal major at the Department of Culture, Art and Tourism – Ben Tre College, and was a music teacher at Thanh Thoi A1 Primary School, Thanh Thoi A Commune, Mo Cay Nam. In an interview with VnExpress, he said:

Jack used to be a member in the group G5R, an underground Vietnamese music group. He debuted in several music videos with this group, such as "Giai Dieu Mien Tay". He became popular within the underground Vietnamese music industry when he released the music video "Ve Ben Anh", however it was not as popular in V-pop. On February 19, 2019, Jack released the song "Hồng nhan" with a music video on YouTube. Within its first week of release, the song debuted at No. 2 on Zing MP3, eventually reaching No. 1. The song has more than 13 million streams on Zing MP3 and 10 million views on YouTube after one week. Due to the popularity of this song, Jack was compared to Phan Mạnh Quỳnh and Đen Vâu. From there, he emerged as a music phenomenon.

2019: Cooperation with K-ICM 
After "Sóng gió" became a hit, he departed from the group G5R. After that, he collaborated with music producer K-ICM and released the song "Bạc Phận" in April 2019. Together, they continued the story series of "Sóng gió" and it was widely received. Later, Jack collaborated with producer Liam and performed the song "Sao em vô tình". These ballad-oriented music products were well-received by the public. Continuing his collaboration with K-ICM, Jack released the song "Sóng gió" and promoted it as the third part of "Hồng nhan". After its release, the song gained massive viewership on YouTube. He also released songs such as "Em gì ơi", "Việt Nam tôi" and "Hoa vô sắc". Since then, his name has occupied a high position in the V-pop music scene. However, by the end of 2019, there was a rumor circulating on Internet that he and K-ICM were at odds, and K-ICM exploiting Jack's labor. In response, he posted on his Facebook account that the release of "Hoa vô sắc" was only a demo version. The song has just been recorded as a test without singing in parts. However, K-ICM voluntarily posted this song on his YouTube channel. After an interview with the content affirming "not exploiting Jack", K-ICM received many negative reactions from the audience.

2020−present: Solo activities and Running Man Vietnam 
After his controversy with K-ICM, he is said to have collaborated with ViruSs to release a demo of the song "Đom đóm" on December 29, 2019. The demo reached No.1 of YouTube trending Vietnam within 4 hours.

On February 17, 2020, Jack officially announced his own YouTube channel called J97. After joining Nomad MGMT Vietnam, he released the song "La 1 Thang Con Trai" on March 10, 2020, on J97's YouTube channel in association with music producer Hoaprox. The song received positive reactions from artists and fans, with some saying that this is just the beginning of Jack's challenge with various types of music.

In addition, he received the YouTube Silver Play Button within a few hours after he created his channel. Soon after, J97 quickly surpassed Bà Tân Vlog, becoming the fastest channel to receive the YouTube Gold Play Button in Vietnam within seven days of creating a channel.

On September 22, 2020, Jack officially released the music video of his first self-produced song "Hoa Hai Duong". The video reached 1 million views in 20 minutes. After 24 hours, "Hoa Hai Duong" became trending on YouTube in seven countries, including Taiwan, Canada, Australia, Germany, United States and South Korea, and it also led the sale of music on iTunes Vietnam.

On October 6, 2020, MTV Vietnam officially announced the artists who would represent Vietnam to compete at MTV Europe Music Awards 2020 and the 2020 Asian Television Awards. Jack overcame many singers as Duc Phuc, Hoang Thuy Linh, Han Sara, Binz, and more to become the winner of the domestic voting. On November 9, 2020, after over one month of voting process, MTV Europe called Jack as the winner of the Best Southeast Asian Artist category by livestream, surpassing a series of names from Southeast Asia. Thus, Jack is the fourth Vietnamese artist after My Tam (2013), Son Tung M-TP (2015) and Dong Nhi (2016) to win this award. On November 22, 2020, Jack joined FWD Music Tour in Danang and release a demo of the song "Thứ anh cần là melody".

On December 26, 2020, Jack officially released the song Dom Dom. This was considered one of the most anticipated songs not only for Jack's fans but also for many V-pop followers. Dom Dom accumulated 295,556 premiere views on YouTube. The song quickly rose to No. 1 of Zing MP3 Chart within one hour and 4 minutes, setting a V-pop record in 2020. After two days of launch, Dom Dom has reaped great successes: reaching No 1 on trending of YouTube in Vietnam and entering the top trending in many other countries: top 9 in Taiwan, top 28 in Germany, top 24 of YouTube Trending worldwide and top 2 in iTunes Vietnam.

At the Zing Music Awards 2020 held on January 7, 2021, Jack won 2 awards, Most Popular Male Artist and Most Favorite Dance/Electronic Song with the song Hoa Hải Đường.

On January 14, 2021, at the 26th Golden Apricot Blossom Awards (Mai Vang) Ceremony, Jack was named as the winner of the Most Favorite Light Music Male Singer Act. This is the first Golden Apricot Blossom Award in his singing career. On January 16, 2021, the 2020 Asian Television Awards Organizing Committee named Jack's Hoa Hai Duong as the winning MV in the Best Music Video category. This is the second international award after the MTV EMA that Jack achieved in his singing career.

On April 12, 2021, on his 24th birthday, Jack released the song "Laylalay", in collaboration with DTAP with the music video directed by Đinh Hà Uyên Thư, but didn't get as many premiere views as his previous releases.

Jack was revealed to be the 9th member in the lineup for the second season of Running Man Vietnam, but he departed from the show after only four episodes.

Artistry 
Tuan's stage name "Jack" was inspired by his father's love to movie star Jackie Chan.

Jack's most prominent music products include "Hong Nhan", "Bac Phan" and "Sóng gió" which is a blend of pop, electronic music, and Vietnamese folk music. In an interview with Zing News, Jack asserted that his songs are "a sadness of nostalgia combined by Chinese and Vietnamese music". Regarding his vocal, he is judged by the public to have a unique vocal. Jack himself once admitted that he "can sing songs that he has in tune with in terms of genre, lyrics, melody or story." Writing on Vietnamnet, the journalist Le Thi My Niem evaluated about Jack:

Zing News journalist Quang Duc evaluated about Jack's music in 2020:

Public image and scandal 
On September 23, 2020, Vivo Vietnam officially announced Jack to become the brand ambassador for Vivo V20. Jack said:

On October 5, 2020, PlayerUnknown's Battlegrounds Mobile Vietnam officially announced that Jack will be the brand ambassador in Vietnam. Jack will cooperate with PUBGM to do meaningful things for his fan community in particular and the society in general, starting with a fundraising project for the Vietnam Children's Fund called "Road Running To Morning". This is also an affirmation of Jack not to be only as a talented singer, but also a person who has a positive influence on society.

On December 3, 2020, YouTube Vietnam announced 3 trending charts: Top 10 Most Featured Videos 2020, Top 10 Most Featured Music Videos 2020 and Top 10 Most Featured Videos Creators in 2020, in which, in the category of Top 10 Most Featured Music Videos, there were two of his music videos "Hoa Hai Duong" and "La 1 Thang Con Trai" respectively ranked at No.6 and No.2.

On December 9, 2020, Google Vietnam announced The Google's Year in Search 2020 with many search topics. With two songs "Hoa Hai Duong" and "Song Gio" in the 'Top 10 Most Featured Songs of the Year', Jack personally ranked 3rd in Top 10 Most Searched People of the Year. Jack was the most prominent singer in 2020 with the great interest from the Vietnamese public.

Other ventures

Philanthropy 
On March 28, 2020, Jack's mother presented at the Cultural Center of Ben Tre to donate 100,000,000₫ for the COVID-19 prevention support. In addition, Jack also transferred 50,000,000₫ to the fans' fund to support the fight against drought at his hometown. Then, on August 13, 2020, he donated for Da Nang 200,000 medical masks to support the COVID-19 prevention.

Copyright controversies 
The song released in 2019 in collaboration with his K-ICM, "Em Gì Ơi", was accused of plagiarizing a Thai children's song titled "ฝนเทลงมา" by channel พอดี ม่วน STUDIO on YouTube. Then, in 2021, this song continued to be accused of being similar to the first measures of the song "Vì ai em ra đi?" by Akira Phan.

"Đom đóm" was believed to have been copied from the song "Blue and white porcelain" (青花瓷) by Jay Chou

The demo song "Thứ anh cần là melody" (now is the chorus of the song "LayLaLay") was suspected of plagiarizing the song "It Ain't Me" by Kygo featuring Selena Gomez and the chorus of the song "Read My Mind" by The Killers.

"Ngôi sao cô đơn" was widely believed by many netizens to have plagiarized The Weeknd's song "Blinding Lights".

Personal life 
On August 7, 2021, a post along with many audio recordings and an image of a stamped birth certificate of a woman named Thúy Vy accused Jack of having multiple sexual relationships and had a child with his ex-girlfriend Thiên An – who starred with him in music video "Sóng gió" in 2019, went viral online. The next day, Thiên An confirmed it on her Facebook account.

On August 10, 2021, Jack posted a status on his fan page, admitted having a voluntary relationship with Thiên An. He apologized to his fans and promised to take responsibility for this incident.

Discography

Singles

Filmography

Awards and nominations

References

External links

 Jack on Instagram
 Jack  on TikTok
 Official Youtube Channel
 Group FanClub Official of Jack 

1997 births
Living people
Vietnamese idols
Vietnamese pop singers
21st-century Vietnamese male singers
Vietnamese songwriters
People from Bến Tre Province
MTV Europe Music Award winners